The Human Race Theatre Company is the professional producing theatre company of Dayton Ohio, dedicated to producing works on universal themes that explore the human condition and startle us all into a renewed awareness of ourselves. The HRTC is located in The Metropolitan Arts Building in downtown Dayton. The 212-seat Loft Theatre in downtown Dayton, Ohio serves as its home base, though it also stages one production each year in the 1,100-seat historic Victoria Theatre on their Broadway series.

The Human Race has put on more than 160 productions since its inception in 1986, and has an extensive theatre education program that annually serves more than 30,000 children and adults throughout southwestern Ohio.
The Human Race Theatre Company is noted for its Musical Theatre Workshops, staged readings of new works, which began in 2000

As of 2022, Emily Wells is the company's artistic director, the fourth in Human Race's History following Suzy Bassani (1986-1993), Marsha Hanna (1993-2011) and Kevin Moore. Moore was also the founding executive director.

References

External links

 

Companies based in Dayton, Ohio
Regional theatre in the United States